Alberto Brizzi (born 26 March 1984) is an Italian former professional tennis player. On 8 February 2010 he reached his highest ATP singles ranking of 230 while his best doubles ranking was 253 on 15 August 2011.

References

External links
 
 
 

Italian male tennis players
Living people
1984 births
21st-century Italian people